Alfred Kemah Jaryan (born 24 September 1988) is a Liberian professional football who plays as a midfielder.

Career

Mohammedan
In 2010, Alfred moved to India and signed with Mohammedan Sporting and appeared in the I-League.

Mumbai
Alfred scored a goal in 2–1 victory against Shillong Lajong in 2013–14 I-League. He scored an equalizer against Dempo in 88th minute to earn a point for his team.

Aizawl
Alfred then signed for newly promoted Aizawl FC for the 2016 edition of the Hero I-League. He scored in the third match against DSK Shivajians FC at home. Jaryan has all time most appearances for Aizawl. He also won Mizoram Premier League with club.

Career statistics

Club

International career
Following his impressive I-league campaign with Aizawl FC, Jaryan was called up to the national squad for the Africa Cup of Nations qualifying match against Zimbabwe on 11 June 2017. He did not appear in the 3–0 defeat.

Honours
Aizawl
I-League: 2016–17
Mizoram Premier League: 2015–16, 2018–19

Individual
Best Forward of the FAO League: 2011
Best Midfielder I-League: 2016–17

References

External links

1988 births
Living people
Liberian footballers
I-League players
I-League 2nd Division players
Place of birth missing (living people)
Mumbai FC players
Mohammedan SC (Kolkata) players
Aizawl FC players
Liberian expatriate footballers
Liberian expatriate sportspeople in India
Expatriate footballers in India
Association football forwards
Aryan FC players
Calcutta Football League players